Sam Julian Bramham, OAM (born 23 May 1988) is an Australian Paralympic swimmer. He competed at the 2004 and 2008 Summer Paralympics.  Between those two Games, he won two gold medals, two silver medals and a bronze medal. In 2014 Bramham entered the eleventh season of Big Brother Australia and was a contestant in the first season of Australian Ninja Warrior in 2017.

Personal life
Bramham tells several stories about how he lost his leg; one story involves his leg being eaten off by an alligator.  Another story is that a shark attacked him. A third story, one he often tells international journalists, involves his leg being "chomped off by a kangaroo".  The reality is that he was born missing part of his limb: he has no femur.  What remained of his leg was amputated when he was five years old.

Bramham was born on 23 May 1988 and is from Ivanhoe, Victoria, where he attended Ivanhoe Grammar School.  One of his heroes is Geoff Huegill. Outside of swimming, he competes at water polo, Australian rules football and rugby union.  Amongst these sports, rugby union was his preferred sport, and he played it at school until the school removed him from the team, citing concerns that his prosthetic leg may potentially injure his teammates and opposing players.  Not being able to play his first choice sport was one of the reasons he got involved with swimming.

Swimming
Bramham first represented Australia internationally in 2004.  His highest international ranking was number one.  He was coached by Matt Byrne of the Tritons Swimming Club. In 2000, he competed at the Pacific School Games. In 2006, he competed in the World Championships in Berlin, Germany where he set a world record and won a gold medal.  To Bramah's disappointment, four months before the start of the 2006 Commonwealth Games held in Melbourne, Victoria, the games announced they would not include Elite Athletes with Disability  butterfly swimming on the event schedule. To qualify for the Commonwealth Games, he switched to and qualified to compete in the 100 m freestyle. In 2011, he competed in the Can-Am Swimming Open, where he earned gold medals in two events:  S9 100 m freestyle and 50 m and 100 m butterfly. He has been an Australian Institute of Sport paralympic swimming and Victorian Institute of Sport scholarship holder.

Paralympics
Bramham was one of the youngest Australian competitors at the 2004 Paralympics. He earned a bronze medal in the first Games he competed at in the Men's 4×100  m medley 34 event. He broke a world record in Athens during one of the heats for the 100 m butterfly event.  He won a gold medal at the 2004 Athens Games in the men's 100 m butterfly S9 event, a gold medal in the men's 4×100 m medley 34 pts event and a silver medal in the men's 4×100 m freestyle 34 pts event. He won a gold medal at the 2008 Beijing Games in the men's 100 m butterfly S9 event, a gold medal in the men's 4×100 m medley 34 pts event and a silver medal in the men's 4×100 m freestyle 34 pts event.

Professional career
Sam is a professionally trained public/motivational speaker and has spoken to schools, councils, businesses, sports groups and charities – collecting years of speaking experience. Sam started on the public speaking circuit in 2004 after media attention he received for success at the Athens Paralympics and for telling American media that his leg was mauled off by a kangaroo. From what began as informative sessions offering a few laughs, Sam's presentations have grown into a series of diverse presentations. Sam is also radio trained and media friendly, with regular appearances on stations such as SEN, Joy, SYN FM and ABC Digital.

Sam works at two hospitality venues, Chei Wen Wine Bar and Fly Lie Bar, owned by long-term friend Blair Mantesso.

Charitable work and philanthropy
Sam commits a lot of his time to charity, working with young kids with disability, disadvantaged and underprivileged youth, victims of bullying and upskilling troubled teens. He is an ambassador for Disability Sport and Recreation, Bully Zero Australia, OzChild and Group Training Association of Victoria.

Recognition
In 2009, Bramham received the Medal of the Order of Australia "For service to sport as a gold medallist at the Beijing 2008 Paralympic Games".

Big Brother
From 9 September 2014, Bramham appeared as a housemate on the 11th season of Big Brother Australia on the Nine Network. He entered the house on Day 2 where he was partnered with Cat Law, a midwife, whom he played the game with until Day 8 when as part of a pair swap was made by then-heads of house pair Dion Kallis and Jason Roses he was paired with Ryan Ginns (who was announced winner during the finale on 26 November 2014). He was evicted on Day 37.

References

1988 births
Living people
Paralympic gold medalists for Australia
Paralympic silver medalists for Australia
Paralympic bronze medalists for Australia
Male Paralympic swimmers of Australia
Swimmers from Melbourne
Swimmers at the 2004 Summer Paralympics
Swimmers at the 2008 Summer Paralympics
Recipients of the Medal of the Order of Australia
Australian Institute of Sport Paralympic swimmers
Victorian Institute of Sport alumni
Medalists at the 2004 Summer Paralympics
Medalists at the 2008 Summer Paralympics
Big Brother (Australian TV series) contestants
S9-classified Paralympic swimmers
Paralympic medalists in swimming
Australian male butterfly swimmers
People from Ivanhoe, Victoria
People educated at Ivanhoe Grammar School
Sportsmen from Victoria (Australia)